The Connexion is a news website and monthly newspaper for residents, second-home owners and visitors to France. It was founded in September 2002 and currently claims just over 20,000 subscribers. ConnexionFrance.com receives around 800,000 unique visitors and 2,000,000 page views every month. The print edition has a circulation of 40,000 a month. It is also on sale in 6,000 newsagents and supermarkets across France.

The Connexion readership is English-speaking, consisting predominantly of British baby boomers. Most of its readers live permanently in France or own a second home there.

News coverage 

The Connexion features coverage of French headlines and provides practical information on topical issues including COVID-19 and Brexit as well as advice on French property law, healthcare, tax and pensions in France. During the ongoing coronavirus pandemic, it has provided resources and information in English to help readers navigate lockdown rules and the vaccination campaign, especially those who are not able to speak French.

It has also closely followed the progress of Brexit and the changes brought about by the Withdrawal Agreement made on January 24, 2020, and the 'full' deal signed on December 20, 2020. ConnexionFrance.com has a dedicated Brexit section where it reports on Brexit news that impacts Britons living or owning property in France.

Help Guides 

The Connexion publishes a number of English-language downloadable guides with practical information for living and owning property in France. There are currently Help Guides on Brexit, owning property, income tax, inheritance law, currency exchange and healthcare in France.

Subscription options 

The Connexion offers two types of subscription: Print + Digital and Digital-only. The Print + Digital option includes the monthly newspaper and 'French Living' culture and lifestyle magazine.

Currently, the majority of subscriptions to The Connexion are Print + Digital. There is a continuing demand for the print edition, through growth in Digital-only subscriptions currently outperforms that of Print + Digital.

Move to dynamic paywall model 

English Language Media made the move to a dynamic paywall model for ConnexionFrance.com in 2020. Previously, articles on the website were a mixture of free and paid-for. Subscribers to the print edition were able to access all of the articles online while non-subscribers could only read the free stories.

The dynamic paywall now allows non-subscribers to read up to three of the stories for free per month. Once they meet the quota, they are encouraged to register for an extra free read or subscribe.

References

External links 
 

2002 establishments in France
Publications established in 2002
English-language newspapers published in France
Mass media in Nice
French news websites